Chilhowie High School is located in the town of Chilhowie, Virginia.  It was founded in 1959 and is part of the Smyth County School Division.

Extra curricular activities
Chilhowie competes in VHSL sanctioned baseball, basketball, cross country, football, golf, softball, track, wrestling, and volleyball.  Chilhowie competes academically in the Southwest Academic Conference.

Football
Chilhowie won the VHSL Group A state championship in 1970 with a score of 7–6 over Fluvanna.  On September 14, 1979, Chilhowie beat Holston High School in a Hogoheegee District game 91–0.

External links
Official Chilhowie High School Site
Class of 1959 Site

References

Public high schools in Virginia
Schools in Smyth County, Virginia